Wiązowna  is a village in Otwock County, Masovian Voivodeship, in east-central Poland. It is the seat of the gmina (administrative district) called Gmina Wiązowna.

The village has a population of 980.

Climate
Wiązowna has a dry-summer humid continental climate (Köppen Dsb).

External links
 Jewish Community in Wiązowna on Virtual Shtetl

References

Villages in Otwock County
Masovian Voivodeship (1526–1795)
Warsaw Governorate
Warsaw Voivodeship (1919–1939)–